Jayvin Van Deventer (born January 1, 2004) is an American soccer player who plays as a midfielder for Northwestern Wildcats.

Club career

Youth
Van Deventer began his career in the youth academy of Sporting Kansas City in 2017. On April 30, 2021, it was announced that Van Deventer had signed a USL academy contract with Sporting Kansas City II, the club's reserve side, in order to play USL Championship games while remaining NCAA eligible. He made his senior debut for the club a day later on May 1 against FC Tulsa, starting in a 0–2 defeat.

College
In 2022, Van Deventer attended Northwestern University to play college soccer.

Career statistics

References

External links
 Profile at U.S. Soccer Development Academy

2004 births
Living people
American soccer players
Association football midfielders
MLS Next Pro players
Northwestern Wildcats men's soccer players
Sporting Kansas City II players
USL Championship players